Nader Faryadshiran (born 15 December 1954 in Ahvaz, Iran) is an Iranian football coach. He is a long-time assistant of Mohammad Mayeli Kohan, as they worked together at Foolad, Saipa, Gahar and Malavan.

References

1954 births
Living people
Iranian football managers
People from Ahvaz
Sportspeople from Khuzestan province